LC de Villiers Oval or Tuks Cricket Oval is a cricket ground in Pretoria, South Africa. It is located in the premises of the Pretoria University. It is an occasional home ground for Northerns cricket team.

The university's High Performance Centre which was established in 2002 has become the favored location for the pre-departure camps of Team South Africa in addition to being chosen by several national and international federations as their preferred specialization centre.

Oval consist of 6 cricket fields, 3 Football fields, one rugby, two hockey field.  Stadium is also shared with athletics. All field has floodlights with capacity of 2,000 persons. The oval hosted two Youth ODIs in 1998 ICC Under-19s World Cup and five women's ODIs in 2005 International Women's Cricket Council World Cup.

In 2013, Indian opening batsman Shikhar Dhawan scored unbeaten 248 run on this ground against South Africa A.

Tournaments hosted 

 1998 ICC Under-19 Cricket World Cup
 2005 Women's Cricket World Cup
 2009 ICC World Cup Qualifier

References

External links 
 cricinfo
 cricketarchive

Cricket grounds in South Africa
Multi-purpose stadiums in South Africa
Sports venues in Pretoria
Sports venues completed in 1993